William Bryan may refer to:

People
 William Bryan (North Carolina politician) (1725–1781), American militia general and politician
 William James Bryan (1876–1908), U.S. Senator from Florida
 William Jennings Bryan (1860–1925), orator and three-time Democratic nominee for U.S. President
 Statue of William Jennings Bryan, a 1937 bronze sculpture
 William Joel Bryan (1815–1903), Texas soldier and land owner, namesake of Bryan, Texas
 William Joseph Bryan (1926–1977), American hypnotist
 William Lowe Bryan (1860–1955), 10th president of Indiana University
 William Alanson Bryan (1875–1942), American zoologist, ornithologist, naturalist and museum director
 William C. Bryan (1852–1933), United States Army soldier and Medal of Honor recipient
 William E. Bryan Jr. (1921–2008), United States Air Force major general and flying ace
 William Bryan (cricketer) (1856–1933), English cricketer
 Billy Bryan (born 1955), American football player
 Billy Bryan (baseball) (born 1938), American former Major League Baseball catcher
 William "Roddie" Bryan (born 1969), American convicted for the murder of Ahmaud Arbery

Ships
 William Bryan,  a New Zealand Company barque that arrived at New Plymouth, New Zealand with settlers on 31 March 1841

See also
William Brien (disambiguation)
 William O'Bryan (1778–1868), founder of the Bible Christians
 William Cullen Bryant (1794–1878), American poet, journalist, and long-time editor of The New-York Evening Post
 William Bryant (disambiguation)